"A Thousand Beautiful Things" is a song by Annie Lennox, released in 2004 as the second "promotional-only" single from her album Bare.

Music video
Despite not officially released as a single, a music video was made but remains unreleased. It can, however, be seen on YouTube.

Track listing 
 "A Thousand Beautiful Things" (Blu Mar Ten Vocal)
 "A Thousand Beautiful Things" (Blu Mar Ten Dub)
 "A Thousand Beautiful Things" (Squint Remix)
 "A Thousand Beautiful Things" (Chamber Remix)

Dance Vault Mixes
 "A Thousand Beautiful Things" (Peter Rauhofer Beautiful Strings Anthem) – 10:34
 "A Thousand Beautiful Things" (Gabriel and Dresden Techfunk Mix) – 9:10
 "A Thousand Beautiful Things" (Bimbo Jones Stealth Mix) – 7:55
 "A Thousand Beautiful Things" (Peter Rauhofer Short Club Mix) – 8:48
 "A Thousand Beautiful Things" (Bimbo Jones Stealth Dub) – 5:04

Personnel  
Andy Wright – producer
Stephen Lipson – producer

See also
 List of Billboard Hot Dance Club Play number ones of 2004

Charts

References

2004 singles
Annie Lennox songs
Songs written by Annie Lennox
Song recordings produced by Stephen Lipson
2003 songs
J Records singles